Loftus Tottenham Wigram QC (6 November 1803 – 19 September 1889) was a British barrister, businessman and Conservative politician.

Life
Wigram was a younger son of Lady Eleanor and Sir Robert Wigram, 1st Baronet. His numerous brothers included Sir Robert Fitzwygram, 2nd Baronet (1773–1843), a Director of the Bank of England and a Tory Member of Parliament who changed his name from Wigram to Fitzwygram, Sir James Wigram, a judge, Octavius Wigram, Joseph Cotton Wigram, Bishop of Rochester, and George Wigram. He was a part-owner of Wigram and Green, shipbuilders.

In 1850, Wigram was returned to parliament as one of two representatives for Cambridge University, a seat he held until 1859. He was a regular contributor in the House of Commons, speaking 150 times during his nine-year stint in parliament.

Wigram married Lady Katherine Jane, daughter of Thomas Douglas, 5th Earl of Selkirk, in 1849. She died in September 1863. Wigram died in September 1889, aged 85.

References

External links 
 

1803 births
1889 deaths
Younger sons of baronets
UK MPs 1847–1852
UK MPs 1852–1857
UK MPs 1857–1859
19th-century King's Counsel
Members of the Parliament of the United Kingdom for the University of Cambridge
Conservative Party (UK) MPs for English constituencies